Shoshoni is a town in Fremont County, Wyoming, United States. The population was 471 at the 2020 census, down from 649 at the 2010 census. The town is named for the Shoshone Indian tribe, most of whom live on the nearby Wind River Indian Reservation.

History
Established as a railroad and mining town, Shoshoni lies at the intersection of U.S. Routes 20 and 26, which together were formerly known as the "Yellowstone Highway". Shoshoni has a dramatic increase in visitors in the summer, when roads to Yellowstone National Park are open. Visitors also stop to camp and fish at nearby Boysen Reservoir and the surrounding Boysen State Park. Anglers participate in fishing derbies at the reservoir, including an ice fishing derby in the winter.

Ranching is, and has been for decades, the major agricultural endeavor in the nearby area.

Charles Henry King, a prominent millionaire businessman and banker later based in Omaha, Nebraska, built the C.H. King Company and First Union Bank Building, formerly occupied by Yellowstone Drug Store. The building is listed on the National Register of Historic Places. King and his wife Martha were the paternal grandparents of President Gerald Ford, who was born in their Omaha house in July 1913.

In 2004 a water-intensive mushroom processing plant began operation on land that was annexed by the town and put within its limits. At first it was staffed by prison labor, who were paid minimum wage, in a prison industries program. When they had trouble with production, the plant hired skilled labor from Guatemala. This labor practice stopped when a Department of Homeland Security investigation revealed that some of the workers had problems with their immigration histories. More recently, the plant has ensured all migrant workers are legal. During operations, the plant's composting bunkers emitted unpleasant odors, resulting in numerous complaints from residents during 2005. The Wyoming Department of Environmental Quality investigated the situation and air quality issues. The plant installed a stack and ventilating system in early 2006 to control and disperse odor from the composting bunkers. As of early May 2009, the facility was up for sale.

In January, 2020, the Iglesia Ni Cristo, a Philippines-based religious sect, purchased the facility with the intent of using local "honor based" labor to work in the facility.

Geography

Climate

According to the Köppen Climate Classification system, Shoshoni has a cold desert climate, abbreviated "BWk" on climate maps.

Shoshoni's closest body of water is Boysen Reservoir, which is also the confluence of the Wind River, Badwater Creek and Poison Creek. As the water exits the dam it flows into the Wind River Canyon and joins the Big Horn River at the Wedding of the Waters at the canyon egress.

Demographics

2010 census
As of the census of 2010, there were 649 people, 278 households, and 180 families residing in the town. The racial makeup of the town was 91.1% White, 1.1% African American, 5.1% Native American, 0.6% Asian, 0.6% from other races, and 1.5% from two or more races. Hispanic or Latino of any race were 9.6% of the population.

There were 278 households, of which 32.0% had children under the age of 18 living with them, 45.7% were married couples living together, 12.2% had a female householder with no husband present, 6.8% had a male householder with no wife present, and 35.3% were non-families. 30.6% of all households were made up of individuals, and 13.7% had someone living alone who was 65 years of age or older. The average household size was 2.33 and the average family size was 2.83.

The median age in the town was 39.3 years. 25.7% of residents were under the age of 18; 7% were between the ages of 18 and 24; 24.5% were from 25 to 44; 29.2% were from 45 to 64; and 13.6% were 65 years of age or older. The gender makeup of the town was 51.0% male and 49.0% female.

2000 census
As of the census of 2000, there were 635 people, 246 households, and 171 families residing in the town. The population density was 192.1 people per square mile (74.1/km2). There were 322 housing units at an average density of 97.4 per square mile (37.6/km2). The racial makeup of the town was 93.39% White, 0.16% African American, 1.26% Native American, 1.10% Asian, 0.94% from other races, and 3.15% from two or more races. Hispanic or Latino of any race were 3.94% of the population.

There were 246 households, out of which 37.0% had children under the age of 18 living with them, 54.5% were married couples living together, 11.8% had a female householder with no husband present, and 30.1% were non-families. 27.2% of all households were made up of individuals, and 12.6% had someone living alone who was 65 years of age or older. The average household size was 2.58 and the average family size was 3.14.

In the town, the population was spread out, with 30.4% under the age of 18, 7.9% from 18 to 24, 24.1% from 25 to 44, 21.3% from 45 to 64, and 16.4% who were 65 years of age or older. The median age was 37 years. For every 100 females, there were 94.2 males. For every 100 females age 18 and over, there were 97.3 males.

The median income for a household in the town was $31,250, and the median income for a family was $37,045. Males had a median income of $31,875 versus $14,479 for females. The per capita income for the town was $12,584. About 7.1% of families and 8.3% of the population were below the poverty line, including 8.3% of those under age 18 and 16.5% of those age 65 or over.

Education
Public education in the town of Shoshoni is provided by Fremont County School District #24. The district has three campuses – Shoshoni Elementary School (grades PK–6), Shoshoni Junior High School (grades 7–8) and Shoshoni High School (grades 9–12).

Notable people
 Isabel Jewell (1907–1972), actress on Broadway and in Hollywood, especially in the 1930s and early 1940s

In popular culture 
Marcus Sakey, in his Brilliance trilogy, lists Shoshoni as one of the three entrances (along with Gillette and Rawlins) to the New Canaan Holdfast, a large portion of Wyoming land owned by "abnorms".

References

Towns in Fremont County, Wyoming
Towns in Wyoming